Francisco del Villar (1920 – 1 September 1978) was a Mexican film director, producer and screenwriter. He directed 22 films between 1952 and 1975. His film El tejedor de milagros was entered into the 12th Berlin International Film Festival.

Selected filmography
 El tejedor de milagros (1962)
 Los Cuervos están de luto (1965)
 Las Pirañas aman en Cuaresma (1969)
 El Monasterio de los Buitres (1973)
 La Viuda Negra (1977 - writer)
 El lugar sin límites (1978 - producer)

References

External links

1920 births
1978 deaths
Mexican film directors
Mexican film producers
20th-century Mexican screenwriters
20th-century Mexican male writers